Lewis and Clark County is a county located in the U.S. state of Montana. As of the 2020 census, the population was 70,973. Its county seat is Helena, the state capital. The numerical designation for Lewis and Clark County (used in the issuance of the state's license plates) is 5. The county was established on June 2, 1865 as one of the nine original counties of the Territory of Montana named Edgerton County in honor of Sidney Edgerton, first Governor of the Territory of Montana, and was renamed Lewis and Clark County on March 1, 1868 in honor of explorers Meriwether Lewis and William Clark.

Lewis and Clark County is part of the Helena, Montana Micropolitan Statistical Area.

Geography

Major highways

Adjacent counties

 Teton County - north
 Cascade County - east
 Meagher County - east
 Broadwater County - southeast
 Jefferson County - south
 Powell County - west
 Flathead County - northwest

National protected areas

 Flathead National Forest (part)
 Helena National Forest (part)
 Lewis and Clark National Forest (part)
 Lolo National Forest (part)
 Rocky Mountain Front Conservation Area (part)

Politics
Lewis and Clark County leans slightly Republican, but it has voted for Democratic candidates three times since 1964. Bill Clinton won by nearly seven percentage points in 1992, but Bob Dole won by 130 votes in 1996. Barack Obama carried the county in 2008 but lost it to Mitt Romney in 2012.

Demographics

2000 census
As of the census of 2000, there were 55,716 people, 22,850 households, and 14,966 families in the county. The population density was 16 people per square mile (6/km2). There were 25,672 housing units at an average density of 7 per square mile (3/km2). The racial makeup of the county was 95.21% White, 0.20% Black or African American, 2.04% Native American, 0.52% Asian American, 0.05% Pacific Islander American, 0.38% from other races, and 1.61% from two or more races.  1.51% of the population were Hispanic or Latino of any race. 22.6% were of German, 15.5% Irish, 10.9% English, 9.5% Norwegian and 6.1% American ancestry.

There were 22,850 households, out of which 32.20% had children under the age of 18 living with them, 52.40% were married couples living together, 9.20% had a female householder with no husband present, and 34.50% were non-families. 29.10% of all households were made up of individuals, and 8.90% had someone living alone who was 65 years of age or older. The average household size was 2.38 and the average family size was 2.95.

The county population contained 25.60% under the age of 18, 8.50% from 18 to 24, 27.90% from 25 to 44, 26.20% from 45 to 64, and 11.70% who were 65 years of age or older. The median age was 38 years. For every 100 females, there were 96.50 males. For every 100 females age 18 and over, there were 94.00 males.

The median income for a household in the county was $37,360, and the median income for a family was $46,766. Males had a median income of $33,515 versus $23,961 for females. The per capita income for the county was $18,763.  About 7.30% of families and 10.90% of the population were below the poverty line, including 12.60% of those under age 18 and 6.50% of those age 65 or over.

In the county of the population that's 25 years old and over 91.4% of them have a high school diploma, 31.6% of that population has a bachelor's degree or higher, 17.2% of the population is disabled, 1.6% of them are foreign born, and only 4.0% of the population can speak another language at home. According to the 2000 Census 59.7% of the population (male) is married but, now separated. For the women it is only 3% lower at 56.7%. The average family size is 2.95. In the county, there are 25,672 homes, 2,822 of which are vacant.

2010 census
As of the census of 2010, there were 63,395 people, 26,694 households, and 16,705 families in the county. The racial makeup of the county was 94.0% white, 2.1% American Indian, 0.6% Asian, 0.3% black or African American, 0.1% Pacific islander, 0.5% from other races, and 2.4% from two or more races. Those of Hispanic or Latino origin made up 2.5% of the population. In terms of ancestry, 29.2% were German, 19.3% were Irish, 15.0% were English, 8.9% were Norwegian, and 5.1% were American.

Of the 26,694 households, 28.8% had children under the age of 18 living with them, 49.0% were married couples living together, 9.4% had a female householder with no husband present, 37.4% were non-families, and 30.7% of all households were made up of individuals. The average household size was 2.30 and the average family size was 2.87. The median age was 40.9 years.

The median income for a household in the county was $50,238 and the median income for a family was $65,573. Males had a median income of $44,476 versus $34,893 for females. The per capita income for the county was $25,894. About 5.8% of families and 9.7% of the population were below the poverty line, including 10.2% of those under age 18 and 4.1% of those age 65 or over.

Communities

City
 Helena (county seat)

Town
 East Helena

Census-designated places

 Augusta
 Canyon Creek
 Craig
 Gilman
 Helena Valley Northeast
 Helena Valley Northwest
 Helena Valley Southeast
 Helena Valley West Central
 Helena West Side
 Lincoln
 Marysville
 Milford Colony
 Rimini
 Unionville
 Wolf Creek
 York

Other unincorporated communities

 Austin
 Bald Butte
 Birdseye
 Canyon Ferry
 Dearborn (partially within Cascade County)
 Fort Harrison Army Air Park
 Four Range
 Frontier Town
 Gearing
 La Chapelle Place
 Nelson
 Silver City
 Stoner Place
 Weed
 Wilborn
 Winston

Notable people

 Seth Bullock, sheriff of Lewis and Clark County, later sheriff of Deadwood, South Dakota.
 Ted Kaczynski, known as the Unabomber, lived in a cabin in Lincoln from 1971 to 1996, during which time he conducted his infamous bombing campaign.
 Mike McGrath, Chief Justice of the Montana Supreme Court, former Montana Attorney General, former County Attorney of Lewis and Clark County.
 Johnny Miljus, major league baseball pitcher, retired to Fort Harrison in Lewis and Clark County.
 W. A. Boyle, president of the UMW, was born in Bald Butte, approximately two miles southwest of Marysville.
 Brian Knight, Major League Baseball umpire
 The governor of Montana, whose official residence is in the state capital of Helena.

See also
 List of lakes in Lewis and Clark County, Montana
 List of mountains in Lewis and Clark County, Montana
 List of counties in Montana
 National Register of Historic Places listings in Lewis and Clark County, Montana

References

External links
 Lewis and Clark County web site

 
Helena, Montana micropolitan area
1865 establishments in Montana Territory
Populated places established in 1865